The Red Shoes may refer to:
 "The Red Shoes" (fairy tale), a 1845 fairy tale by Hans Christian Andersen

Film 
 The Red Shoes (1948 film), by Michael Powell and Emeric Pressburger, inspired by the fairy tale
 The Red Shoes (2005 film), a Korean horror film inspired by the fairy tale
 The Red Shoes (2010 film), a love story from the Philippines

Other uses 
 The Red Shoes (musical), a 1993 Broadway musical composed by Jule Styne based on the 1948 film
 The Red Shoes (ballet), a 2016 ballet choreographed by Matthew Bourne
 The Red Shoes (album), an album by Kate Bush, 1993
 "The Red Shoes" (song) the title song from the Kate Bush album
 "The Red Shoes," the lead single from IU's 2013 album Modern Times
 The Red Shoes, an attraction in the Fairytale Forest of the Dutch amusement park Efteling

See also 
 Red Shoes (disambiguation)